Michèle Marineau (born 1955) is a Canadian writer and translator living in Quebec.

She was born in Montreal and studied medicine, the history of art and translation at the Université de Montréal. She worked for several years as a freelance editor. She published her first novel Cassiopée ou l'été polonais in 1988; it received the Governor General's Award for French-language children's literature. It has been translated into Swedish, Spanish and Catalan. It was translated into English in 1995 as The Road to Chlifa, also appearing in Danish and in Dutch.

She was a finalist for the John Glassco Translation Prize and also appeared three times on the short lists for the Governor General's award for translation.

She is married to writer François Gravel, and is the mother of writer and illustrator Élise Gravel.

Selected works 
 Sur le rivage (1991), translation from Along the shore : tales by the sea by Lucy Maud Montgomery
 Le monde merveilleux de Marigold (1991), translation from Magic for Marigold by Lucy Maud Montgomery
 Au-delà des ténèbres (1993), translation from Among the shadows by Lucy Maud Montgomery
 Anne-- la maison aux pignons verts (1996), condensed translation from Anne of Green Gables by Lucy Maud Montgomery
 Les vélos n'ont pas d'états d'âme (1998), translated into English as Lean Mean Machines (2000)
 Rouge poison (2000), received the Mr. Christie's Book Award
 Cendrillon (2000), retold from the version by Charles Perrault, translated into English as Cinderella (2007)
 L'affreux (2000), based on a First Nations legend
 Marion et le nouveau monde (2002), received the Prix Québec-Wallonie-Bruxelles
 Cassiopée (2002)
 La route de Chlifa (2010)
 Barbouillette! (2011)

References 

1955 births
Living people
Canadian translators
Governor General's Award-winning children's writers
Canadian novelists in French
Writers from Montreal
20th-century Canadian novelists
21st-century Canadian novelists
Canadian women novelists
French Quebecers
20th-century Canadian women writers
21st-century Canadian women writers
Canadian women non-fiction writers
Canadian non-fiction writers in French
Canadian children's writers in French
Canadian women children's writers